Brian Jordan Alvarez (born July 10, 1987) is an American actor, comedian and filmmaker. He is best known for his recurring roles as Estéfan in Will and Grace (2018–2020) and Wesley in Jane the Virgin (2015–2016), as well as for his own self-produced films and series, most notably his 2016 Gotham Award-nominated web series The Gay and Wondrous Life of Caleb Gallo. A prolific creator of comedic web videos, he has developed a dedicated internet following and frequently collaborates with actress Stephanie Koenig.

Early life 
Alvarez was born in Manhattan, New York City to Paul and Angela Jordan Alvarez, an electrical engineer and Spanish instructor, respectively. He has a sister, Catalina. He spent his childhood in Winchester, Tennessee, where he began acting and making movies. In middle school, he was teased and bullied for his sexuality. He went on to attend Saint Andrew's Sewanee School and then the high school program at the University of North Carolina School of the Arts in Winston-Salem, North Carolina. Heavily involved in his school's theater program, he continued to study acting at the USC School of Dramatic Arts where he received his Bachelor of Fine Arts in Acting.

Alvarez is of White and Spanish descent matrilineally, and has roots from the American South from the other side of his family. He speaks Spanish fluently.

Career 
For years, Alvarez formed part of numerous theater productions. Since his days living in the South (Winchester), he has been part of a number of both large and small projects. While at USC, he continued to be a part of plays and cinematic projects collaborating with many of the film students. He was involved in short films, music videos, and several other acting projects.

He collaborated with College Humor on an episode titled, "Gay Men Will Marry Your Girlfriends". He has performed roles in several television shows including: Will & Grace, Hot in Cleveland, Life in Pieces, Jane the Virgin, Go-Go Boy Interrupted, and 2 Broke Girls. In October 2014, he was cast in a supporting role in the MTV scripted comedy pilot Self Promotion. The show, directed by Zach Braff, was ultimately not picked up by the network.

In 2016, Alvarez wrote, produced, directed and starred in the five-part web comedy series The Gay and Wondrous Life of Caleb Gallo. The series played at the 2016 Tribeca Film Festival as part of its New Online Work. The series was nominated for the Gotham Award for Breakthrough Series – Shortform and was named Indiewire’s number-one web series for the year.

Alvarez played the recurring role of Estéfan Gloria, Jack McFarland's fiancé and later husband, in all three seasons of the 2010s revival of NBC's Will & Grace. In August 2020, it was announced Alvarez was cast in the Netflix quarantine anthology series Social Distance. He is set to star in the episode "Zero Feet Away" opposite Max Jenkins.

Alvarez has had multiple viral videos and made appearances on Australian TV due to his ability to do a convincing Australian accent. Beyond this, his videos bring daily comedy through his portrayal of characters he creates using various accents and face filters on Instagram and Tiktok. His comedic style pokes fun at his own upbringing of the south, his experience of people in LA, and of foreign-born relatives.

Personal life 
Brian identifies as gay.

Filmography

Television

Films

Web series and shorts
Selected credits

References

External links

1987 births
Living people
American filmmakers
American gay actors
LGBT people from Tennessee
USC School of Dramatic Arts alumni
American people of Colombian descent
People from Winchester, Tennessee
University of North Carolina School of the Arts alumni
Hispanic and Latino American male actors
LGBT Hispanic and Latino American people
21st-century LGBT people